Purnika Rajya Laxmi Devi Shah (born 10 December 2000) is a former Princess of Nepal. She is the eldest daughter of Paras, former Crown Prince of Nepal and former Crown Princess Himani. She is a granddaughter of former King Gyanendra and Queen Komal.

Biography 

Princess Purnika is third in line to the defunct Nepalese Throne. In July 2006 the Nepalese government proposed changing the succession law to absolute primogeniture. The House of Representatives subsequently approved the bill, but it was not signed into law. This meant that Princess Purnika continued to be third in the order of succession after her father and brother until the abolition of the monarchy in 2008. She is the elder sister of Prince Hridayendra and Princess Kritika.

In July 2008, Princess Purnika left Nepal with her mother, sister and brother to move to Singapore to join her father who had been making arrangements for the family to live in the country. In May 2019 Princess Purnika completed her high-schooling from UWC Thailand.

Footnotes

External links
Royal Court of Nepal

2000 births
Living people
Nepalese princesses
Nepalese emigrants
Immigrants to Singapore
21st-century Nepalese nobility
20th-century Nepalese nobility